Andrea Soraya Ramírez Limón (born 5 December 1992) is a Mexican marathon runner. She is part of the Mexican delegation at the 2020 Summer Olympics.

Personal life
Ramírez has a degree in international relations from the Monterrey Institute of Technology and Higher Education, having obtained it in 2015.

Career
While Ramírez was training as a hobby on the track at her college, one of her coaches encouraged her to officially compete. For a time, Ramírez ran various athletic events informally, until she requested the assistance of a professional marathoner, Jonathan Morales Serrano. Morales refused by telling her that he did not train women, which led Ramírez to ask him to let her convince him, a fact that happened after six months of practice. Morales trained her for two and a half years.

Ramírez's career grew when she ran a half marathon in Monterrey in November 2019, clocking a time of 1:12:44, a fact that allowed her to qualify to run the half marathon in Gdynia, Poland. In this competition, she clocked a time of 1:10:20. In the 2020 Houston Marathon she achieved a mark of 2:29:30; In December 2020 she improved the time, achieving the required mark to qualify for the Tokyo 2020 Olympic Games, when she ran in The Marathon Project, a test that took place in Chandler, Arizona, United States, in a time of 2:26:34.

References

External links
 

1992 births
Living people
Mexican female marathon runners
Mexican female long-distance runners
Monterrey Institute of Technology and Higher Education alumni
Athletes (track and field) at the 2020 Summer Olympics
People from Chimalhuacán
Sportspeople from the State of Mexico
Olympic athletes of Mexico
21st-century Mexican women